The Ribble Link Trust is a waterway society, campaigners, instigators of and involved in the Ribble Link, a navigable waterway that connects the Lancaster Canal to the Leeds and Liverpool Canal in Lancashire, England, via the River Ribble.

The Trust is a member of the Ribble Link Partnership which includes British Waterways, Preston City Council and Lancashire County Council.

The construction was funded by:
 Association of Cruising Enthusiasts    
 Bridgewater Boat Club                   
 Inland Waterways Association        
 Lancaster Canal Boat club
 Lancaster Canal Trust
 Lancashire Environmental Fund
 North Cheshire Cruising Club
 Ribble Cruising Club
 Wheelton Boat Club

The Ribble Link was opened to navigation on 12 July 2002, and the official opening ceremony took place on 20 September 2002. The first boat to travel the Ribble Link belonged to Cliff Fazakerley, chairman of the Ribble Link Trust.

In the Waterways Renaissance Awards 2002, the Ribble Link Partnership won the Partnership category because it demonstrated the best public/private/community partnership.

See also
List of waterway societies in the United Kingdom

External links
UK Government, Select Committee on Environment, Food and Rural Affairs, Memorandum submitted
National Archives, Department of Culture, Media and Sport, Millennium Commission Grants Database
   Ribble Link Trust website

Waterways organisations in England
Lancaster Canal
Clubs and societies in Lancashire